This pages summarizes the results of the 2011-12 season of Gabon Championnat National D1, the top tier of football in Gabon. Fourteen clubs contested the trophy, and the championship winner was CF Mounana.

League table
<onlyinclude>

External links
RSSSF info

Gabon Championnat National D1 seasons
Gabon
football
football